Mathbaria is an upazila of Pirojpur District in the Division of Barisal, Bangladesh.

Geography
It has 48,139 households and a total area of 353.25 km2.

Demographics
According to the 2011 Bangladesh census, the population of Mathbaria Upazila was 262,841. Males constituted 49.0% of the population, and females 51.0%. Mathbaria has an average literacy rate of 61.7% (7+ years), compared to the national average is 51.8%.

Administration
Mathbaria Upazila is divided into Mathbaria Municipality and 11 union parishads: Amragasia, Betmor Rajpara, Boromasua, Daudkhali, Dhanishafa, Gulishakhali, Mathbaria, Mirukhali, Shapleza, Tikikata, and Tuskhali. The union parishads are subdivided into 67 mauzas and 93 villages.

Mathbaria Municipality is subdivided into 9 wards and 16 mahallas.

Notable people
 Hatem Ali Jamadar (1872–1982), member of the Bengal Legislative Assembly

See also
Upazilas of Bangladesh
Districts of Bangladesh
Divisions of Bangladesh

References

Upazilas of Pirojpur District